Richard Myerscough (born 17 November 1965) is a Canadian windsurfer. He competed in the men's Division II event at the 1988 Summer Olympics.

References

External links
 
 
 

1965 births
Living people
Canadian windsurfers
Canadian male sailors (sport)
Olympic sailors of Canada
Sailors at the 1988 Summer Olympics – Division II
Sportspeople from Vancouver